Oulipo (short for ; roughly translated: "workshop of potential literature", stylized OuLiPo) is a loose gathering of (mainly) French-speaking writers and mathematicians who seek to create works using constrained writing techniques. It was founded in 1960 by Raymond Queneau and François Le Lionnais. Other notable members have included novelists Georges Perec and Italo Calvino, poets Oskar Pastior and Jean Lescure, and poet/mathematician Jacques Roubaud.

The group defines the term littérature potentielle as (rough translation): "the seeking of new structures and patterns which may be used by writers in any way they enjoy".  Queneau described Oulipians as "rats who construct the labyrinth from which they plan to escape."

Constraints are used as a means of triggering ideas and inspiration, most notably Perec's "story-making machine", which he used in the construction of Life: A User's Manual. As well as established techniques, such as lipograms (Perec's novel A Void) and palindromes, the group devises new methods, often based on mathematical problems, such as the knight's tour of the chess-board and permutations.

History 
Oulipo was founded on November 24, 1960, as a subcommittee of the Collège de 'Pataphysique and titled Séminaire de littérature expérimentale.  At their second meeting, the group changed its name to Ouvroir de littérature potentielle, or Oulipo, at Albert-Marie Schmidt's suggestion.  The idea had arisen two months earlier, when a small group met in September at Cerisy-la-Salle for a colloquium on Queneau's work. During this seminar, Queneau and François Le Lionnais conceived the society.

During the subsequent decade, Oulipo (as it was commonly known) was only rarely visible as a group. As a subcommittee, they reported their work to the full Collège de 'Pataphysique in 1961. In addition,   devoted an issue to Oulipo in 1964, and Belgian radio broadcast one Oulipo meeting. Its members were individually active during these years and published works which were created within their constraints. Martin Gardner helped to popularize the group in America when he featured Oulipo in his February 1977 Mathematical Games column in Scientific American. In 2012 Harvard University Press published a history of the movement, Many Subtle Channels: In Praise of Potential Literature, by Oulipo member Daniel Levin Becker.

Oulipo was founded by a group of men in 1960 and it took 15 years before the first woman was allowed to join; this was Michèle Métail who became a member in 1975 and has since distanced herself from the group. Since 1960 only six women have joined Oulipo, with Clémentine Mélois last to join in June 2017.

Oulipian works 

Some examples of Oulipian writing:
 Queneau's Exercices de Style is the recounting ninety-nine times of the same inconsequential episode, in which a man witnesses a minor altercation on a bus trip; each account is unique in terms of tone and style.
 Queneau's Cent Mille Milliards de Poèmes is inspired by children's picture books in which each page is cut into horizontal strips that can be turned independently, allowing different pictures (usually of people: heads, torsos, waists, legs, etc.) to be combined in many ways. Queneau applies this technique to poetry: the book contains 10 sonnets, each on a page. Each page is split into 14 strips, one for each line. The author estimates in the introductory explanation that it would take approximately 200 million years to read all possible combinations.
 Perec's novel La disparition, translated into English by Gilbert Adair and published under the title A Void, is a 300-page novel written without the letter "e", an example of a lipogram.  The English translation, A Void, is also a lipogram.  The novel is remarkable not only for the absence of "e", but it is a mystery in which the absence of that letter is a central theme.
 Singular Pleasures by Harry Mathews describes 61 different scenes, each told in a different style (generally poetic, elaborate, or circumlocutory) in which 61 different people (all of different ages, nationalities, and walks of life) masturbate.

Constraints 

Some Oulipian constraints:

 S+7 N+7  Replace every noun in a text with the seventh noun after it in a dictionary. For example, "Call me Ishmael. Some years ago..." becomes "Call me islander. Some yeggs ago...". Results will vary depending upon the dictionary used. This technique can also be performed on other lexical classes, such as verbs.

 Snowball Rhopalism  A poem in which each line is a single word, and each successive word is one letter longer.

 Stile A method wherein each “new” sentence in a paragraph stems from the last word or phrase in the previous sentence (e.g. “I descend the long ladder brings me to the ground floor is spacious…”). In this technique the sentences in a narrative continually overlap, often turning the grammatical object in a previous sentence into the grammatical subject of the next. The author may also pivot on an adverb, prepositional phrase, or other transitory moment.

 Lipogram  Writing that excludes one or more letters. The previous sentence is a lipogram in B, F, J, K, Q, V, Y, and Z (it does not contain any of those letters).

 Prisoner's constraint Macao constraint  A type of lipogram that omits letters with ascenders and descenders (b, d, f, g, h, j, k, l, p, q, t, and y).

 Palindromes Sonnets and other poems constructed using palindromic techniques.

 Univocalism A poem using only one vowel letter. In English and some other languages the same vowel letter can represent different sounds, which means that, for example, "born" and "cot" could both be used in a univocalism. (Words with the same American English vowel sound but represented by different 'vowel' letters could not be used – e.g. "blue" and "stew".)

 Pilish A method of writing wherein one matches the length of words (or amount of words in a sentence) to the digits of pi. 

 Mathews' Algorithm Elements in a text are moved around by a set of predetermined rules

Members

Founding members
The founding members of Oulipo represented a range of intellectual pursuits, including writers, university professors, mathematicians, engineers, and "pataphysicians":

 
 Jacques Bens
 Claude Berge
 
  ("Latis")
 François Le Lionnais
 Jean Lescure
 Raymond Queneau
 Jean Queval
 Albert-Marie Schmidt

Living members

 Michèle Audin 
  
 Marcel Bénabou
 Eduardo Berti
 Bernard Cerquiglini
 
 Paul Fournel
 Anne F. Garréta
 Jacques Jouet
 Hervé Le Tellier
 Étienne Lécroart
 Daniel Levin Becker
 
 
 Ian Monk
 Jacques Roubaud

Deceased members

 
 Jacques Bens
 Claude Berge
 André Blavier
 
 Italo Calvino
 
 
 Stanley Chapman
 Marcel Duchamp
 
 Luc Etienne
 Michelle Grangaud
  ("Latis")
 François Le Lionnais
 Jean Lescure
 Harry Mathews
 Oskar Pastior
 Georges Perec
 Raymond Queneau
 Jean Queval
 Pierre Rosenstiehl
 Albert-Marie Schmidt

See also
Constrained writing
E-Prime
Modernist poetry
Ouxpo
Outrapo
Ougrapo
Oubapo

References

Further reading
 Mathews, Harry & Brotchie, Alastair. Oulipo Compendium. London: Atlas, 1998. 
 Motte, Warren F. (ed) Oulipo: A Primer of Potential Literature. University of Nebraska Press, 1986. .
 Queneau, Raymond, Italo Calvino, et al. Oulipo Laboratory. London: Atlas, 1995. 
 The State of Constraint: New Work by Oulipo. San Francisco: McSweeney's Quarterly Concern Issue 22 (Three Books Held Within By Magnets), 2006. 
 Marc Lapprand, Poétique de l’Oulipo., Amsterdam, Rodopi, coll. « Faux Titre », 1998, 142e éd.
 Warren Motte, Oulipo: A primer in potential literature, University of Nebraska Press, 1988
 Daniel Levin Becker. Many Subtle Channels: In Praise of Potential Literature. Harvard University Press, 2012.
 Lauren Elkin and Scott Esposito. The End of Oulipo? An Attempt to Exhaust a Movement. Zer0 Books, 2013.
 Ian Monk and Daniel Levin Becker (translators), All That Is Evident Is Suspect: Readings from the Oulipo: 1963 - 2018,  McSweeney's, 2018.
 (fr) Jean-Jacques Thomas, La langue, la poésie - essais sur la poésie française contemporaine : Apollinaire, Bonnefoy, Breton, Dada, Eluard, Faye, Garnier, Goll, Jacob, Leiris, Meschonnic, Oulipo, Roubaud, Lille, Presses Universitaires de Lille, coll. « problématiques », 1989
 (fr) Christelle Reggiani et Georges Molinié (dir.), La rhétorique de l'invention de Raymond Roussel à l'Oulipo, thèse de doctorat (nouveau régime), Université de soutenance : Paris-Sorbonne, 1997
 (fr) Oulipo poétiques : Actes du colloque de Salzburg, 23-25 avril 1997 / édités par Peter Kuon ; en collaboration avec Monika Neuhofer et Christian Ollivier, Tübingen : Gunter Narr Verlag, 1999
 Peter Consenstein, Literary memory, consciousness, and the group Oulipo, Amsterdam, Rodopi, 2002
 (fr)Carole Bisenius-Penin, Le roman oulipien, Paris, l'Harmattan, 2008
 Alison James, Constraining chance  : Georges Perec and the Oulipo, Evanston, Ill. : Northwestern University Press, 2009
(fr) Christophe Reig, Anne Chamayou (dir.) et Alastair Ducan (dir.), L’Oulipo sur la scène internationale : ressorts formels et comiques, PUP, 2010 / Actes du Colloque « Le rire européen - échanges et confrontations »
(fr) Christophe Reig, Henri Béhar (dir.) et Pierre Taminiaux (dir.), Oulipo-litiques : Poésie et Politique au XX° siècle, Paris, Hermann, 2011 / Actes du colloque de juillet 2010, Centre Culturel International de Cerisy
(fr) Anne Blossier-Jacquemot et Florence Dupont (dir.), Les Oulipiens antiques : pour une anthropologie des pratiques d'écriture à contraintes dans l'Antiquité, Université Paris Diderot - Paris 7, Atelier national de reproduction des thèses, 2010
 (fr)/(en) « Oulipo@50/L'Oulipo à 50 ans », Revue Formules - revue des créations formelles, n° 16, Presses universitaires du Nouveau Monde, New Orleans, juin 2012
Exhibition at UCL Rm 131 Foster Court - Department of French Prof. Timothy Mathews and Artist in Residence Margarita Saad 'Translation, Transcription, Oulipo Art from French to English' June 2015

External links 
 Excerpts from the Oulipo Compendium
 A special Oulipo folio, Drunken Boat 
 Monica de la Torre, "Oulipo", Poets.org Website
 Queneau, Cent Mille Milliards de Poèmes, BevRowe, interactive version in French and English 
 The N+7 Machine
  Official Oulipo Website
  Oulipo mailing list
  Oulipo Games Website
 Absurdist Monthly Review, The Writers Magazine of The New Absurdist Movement

 
1960 establishments in France
French writers' organizations
'Pataphysics
Constrained writing